Ellabella melanoclista is a moth in the Copromorphidae family. It is found from Arizona to Texas.

The length of the forewings is 9.6-11.2 mm for males and 10-11.2 mm for females. The forewings are dark brown to black, irrorated with white near the base. The hindwings are pale grey-brown. Adults are on wing from March to May.

References

Natural History Museum Lepidoptera generic names catalog

Copromorphidae
Moths described in 1927